Deltoplastis cognata is a moth in the family Lecithoceridae. It was described by Chun-Sheng Wu and Kyu-Tek Park in 1998. It is found in Sri Lanka.

The wingspan is 10–12 mm. The forewings are ochreous yellow with a blackish-brown pattern. There is a roughly rounded, large blotch at the basal one-third closing to the inner margin. The discal spots are rather small and the apex is blackish brown. The hindwings are yellowish brown.

Etymology
The species name is derived from Latin cognatus (meaning related).

References

Moths described in 1998
Deltoplastis